The  ceremony was held on March 5, 2010, by the Japan Academy Film Prize Association to honor its selection of the best films of 2009. NTV broadcast the event, which took place at the Grand Prince Hotel New Takanawa in Tokyo, Japan. The nominations for the Awards were announced on December 22, 2009.

Nominees

Awards

References

External links 
  - 
 The 33rd Japan Academy Prize - 

Japan Academy Film Prize
Japan Academy Film Prize
Japan Academy Film Prize
March 2010 events in Japan